Jacques Lopez (born April 27, 1961, in Marseille, France) is a retired professional footballer. He played as a defender.

External links
Jacques Lopez profile at chamoisfc79.fr

1961 births
Living people
French footballers
Association football defenders
Olympique de Marseille players
AS Cannes players
Dijon FCO players
LB Châteauroux players
Chamois Niortais F.C. players
Ligue 1 players
Ligue 2 players